Altar (also known as The Haunting of Radcliffe House) is a 2014 British horror thriller film directed by Nick Willing from his original screenplay. It is about a British family who move into a dilapidated old manor house on the Yorkshire Moors, only to discover that it has a dark past. The film stars Olivia Williams as Meg Hamilton, Matthew Modine as Alec Hamilton, Antonia Clarke as Penny and Adam Thomas Wright as Harper.

Plot
The Hamilton family move into a large country house on the Yorkshire Moors to supervise its restoration from a dilapidated B&B to the original Victorian grandeur. When Meg Hamilton, wife, mother and renovation expert, loses first her London renovation team after an accident, then a local Yorkshire team too superstitious to continue, she is forced to carry on alone. The discovery of a secret attic room, a Rosicrucian mosaic, a bricked up root cellar and many other unexplainable events gradually convince Meg, her husband Alec and children Penny and Harper, that they are not only restoring the house, but also its original Victorian owners who died 150 years ago. Before they can escape, the house — and its former occupants — force them to spend one last, terrifying night under its roof.

Cast
 Olivia Williams as Meg Hamilton
 Matthew Modine as Alec Hamilton
 Antonia Clarke as Penny Hamilton
 Adam Thomas Wright as Harper Hamilton
 Steve Oram as Nigel Lean
 Rebecca Calder as Isabella
 Stephen Chance as Chares Kendrick Walker
 Richard Dillane as Greg

Release
Altar was premiered on 27 December 2014 as The Haunting of Radcliffe House on Channel 5 Television. Cinedigm and Great Point Media released the film on 17 February 2015 in the United States.

References

External links

2014 television films
2014 films
2010s mystery thriller films
2014 psychological thriller films
British psychological thriller films
British thriller television films
British mystery thriller films
Films directed by Nick Willing
Films scored by Simon Boswell
Films set in country houses
Films set in Yorkshire
2010s English-language films
2010s British films